Events in the year 1960 in Spain.

Incumbents
Caudillo: Francisco Franco

Births
February 16 - Antonio Dechent, actor.
May 7 - Almudena Grandes, writer (died 2021)
May 17 - Margarita Armengol, Olympic swimmer.
October 10 - Karra Elejalde, actor.
September 12 - Manuel Jiménez González, football player and manager.
November 28 - Víctor Fernández, football coach.

Deaths
August 25 - Agustín Sancho.

See also
 List of Spanish films of 1960

References

 
Years of the 20th century in Spain
Spain
Spain